Hiroshima Witness, also released as Voice of Hibakusha, is a documentary film featuring 100 interviews of people who survived the Atomic bombings of Hiroshima and Nagasaki, also known as hibakusha. Hiroshima Witness was produced in 1986 by the Hiroshima Peace Cultural Center and NHK, the public broadcasting company of Japan.

References

External links
 Recorded Testimony of A-bomb Survivors 
  links about witness

1986 films
Japanese documentary films
Documentary films about the atomic bombings of Hiroshima and Nagasaki
Films set in Hiroshima
Films shot in Hiroshima
1986 documentary films
NHK
1980s Japanese films